The 1974 NBA playoffs was the postseason tournament of the National Basketball Association's 1973-74 season. The tournament concluded with the Eastern Conference champion Boston Celtics defeating the Western Conference champion Milwaukee Bucks 4 games to 3 in the NBA Finals. John Havlicek was named NBA Finals MVP.

It was the Celtics' twelfth NBA title, and first accomplished in the post-Bill Russell era. It was the last Finals appearance for Milwaukee until 2021.

This Is The Last Postseason with only 3 rounds and using 8 team, The 1975 NBA Playoffs added a First Round and the round is 4 and expanded to 10.

Using the revised playoff format adopted in 1973, two third-place teams (Buffalo in the East, Detroit in the West) qualified for the playoffs, while the second-place finishers in the Central (Atlanta) and Pacific (Golden State) divisions did not. Also, since the top three Western qualifiers were in the Midwest Division, the two divisional champions in the Western Conference (Milwaukee and Los Angeles) played in the conference semifinals.

With a 4–3 series victory over the Pistons in the first round, the Bulls earned their first playoff series victory. In their first eight years of existence, the Bulls made the playoffs seven times.

As a matter of historical curiosity, 3 of the 4 teams in the 1974 Western Conference bracket (Milwaukee, Detroit and Chicago) now reside in the Eastern Conference.

This was the only appearance of the Capital Bullets in the playoffs under that moniker; they assumed the "Capital" name for one year before changing to the Washington Bullets the next season. It was the playoff debut of the Buffalo Braves, who had joined the league in 1970.

For the first time in BAA/NBA history (dating back to 1947), neither the Lakers (of Minnesota, then Los Angeles) or Warriors (of Philadelphia, then San Francisco and Golden State) participated in a conference (or division prior to 1971) finals series.

Bracket

Conference semifinals

Eastern Conference semifinals

(1) Boston Celtics vs. (4) Buffalo Braves

 Jim McMillian tip in at the buzzer.

 Jo Jo White's free throws with no time left.

This was the first playoff meeting between these two teams.

(2) New York Knicks vs. (3) Capital Bullets

This was the sixth playoff meeting between these two teams, with the Knicks winning four of the previous five meetings.

Western Conference semifinals

(1) Milwaukee Bucks vs. (4) Los Angeles Lakers

 Jerry West’s final NBA game.

This was the third playoff meeting between these two teams, with both teams splitting the prior two meetings.

(2) Chicago Bulls vs. (3) Detroit Pistons

This was the first playoff meeting between these two teams.

Conference finals

Eastern Conference finals

(1) Boston Celtics vs. (2) New York Knicks

 Willis Reed’s final NBA game.

 Dave DeBusschere and Jerry Lucas’ final NBA game.

This was the 10th playoff meeting between these two teams, with the Knicks winning five of the previous nine meetings.

Western Conference finals

(1) Milwaukee Bucks vs. (2) Chicago Bulls

This was the first playoff meeting between these two teams.

NBA Finals: (W1) Milwaukee Bucks vs. (E1) Boston Celtics

 Dave Cowens hits the game-tying shot with 1 minute left in regulation to force the first OT; John Havlicek rebounds his missed-shot and makes the game-tying basket with 5 seconds left in the first OT to force the second OT; Kareem Abdul-Jabbar hits the game-winning sky-hook with 3 seconds left in the second OT.

 Oscar Robertson’s final NBA game.

This was the first playoff meeting between these two teams.

References

External links
 Basketball-Reference.com's 1974 NBA Playoffs page

National Basketball Association playoffs
Playoffs

fi:NBA-kausi 1973–1974#Pudotuspelit